Veliyankode  is a beautiful sandy coastal village and a Gram panchayat in Ponnani taluk, Malappuram district in the state of Kerala, India. It is located on the middle of Malabar Coast, between Ponnani and Perumbadappu.

Demographics
 India census, Veliyankode had a population of 29596 with 14034 males and 15562 females.

Geography
Veliyankode Grama Panchayat is bounded by Biyyam Kayal backwater and Puthuponnani estuary (Ponnani Municipality) to north, Maranchery Grama Panchayat to east, Perumbadappu Grama  Panchayat to south and Arabian Sea to west. Veliyankode Kayal is a backwater at Veliyankode.

Wards of Veliyankode
{ "type": "ExternalData",  "service": "geoshape",  "ids": "Q13114793"}
Veliyankode Grama Panchayat is composed of the following 18 wards:

Transportation
Veliyankode village connects to other parts of India through Kuttippuram town.  National highway No.66 passes through Edappal and the northern stretch connects to Goa and Mumbai.  The southern stretch connects to Cochin and Trivandrum. The nearest airport is at Kozhikode.  The nearest major railway station is at Kuttippuram and Tirur.

Notable people
 Veliyankode Umar Khasi (1763-1856) - freedom fighter and poet.
 Sayyid Sanaullah Makti Tangal (1847-1912) - Educationalist and social reformer.
 K. C. S. Paniker - An artist.

See also
Ponnani
Puthuponnani
Edappal
Maranchery
Perumbadappu

References

   Cities and towns in Malappuram district
Populated coastal places in India
Kuttippuram area